In probability theory, particularly information theory, the conditional mutual information is, in its most basic form, the expected value of the mutual information of two random variables given the value of a third.

Definition

This may be written in terms of the expectation operator: .

Compare with the definition of mutual information.

In terms of PMFs for discrete distributions

This can be simplified as

In terms of PDFs for continuous distributions

This can be simplified as

Some identities
Alternatively, we may write in terms of joint and conditional entropies as

This can be rewritten to show its relationship to mutual information

usually rearranged as the chain rule for mutual information

or

Another equivalent form of the above is

Another equivalent form of the conditional mutual information is

Like mutual information, conditional mutual information can be expressed as a Kullback–Leibler divergence:

Or as an expected value of simpler Kullback–Leibler divergences:
,
.

More general definition
A more general definition of conditional mutual information, applicable to random variables with continuous or other arbitrary distributions, will depend on the concept of regular conditional probability.  (See also.)

This is called the pushforward measure   The support of a random variable is defined to be the topological support of this measure, i.e. 

Now we can formally define the conditional probability measure given the value of one (or, via the product topology, more) of the random variables.

Finally we can define the conditional mutual information via Lebesgue integration:

where the integrand is the logarithm of a Radon–Nikodym derivative involving some of the conditional probability measures we have just defined.

Note on notation
As is common in probability theory, we may use the comma to denote such a joint distribution, e.g. Hence the use of the semicolon (or occasionally a colon or even a wedge ) to separate the principal arguments of the mutual information symbol. (No such distinction is necessary in the symbol for joint entropy, since the joint entropy of any number of random variables is the same as the entropy of their joint distribution.)

Properties

Nonnegativity
It is always true that
,
This result has been used as a basic building block for proving other inequalities in information theory, in particular, those known as Shannon-type inequalities. Conditional mutual information is also non-negative for continuous random variables under certain regularity conditions.

Interaction information
Conditioning on a third random variable may either increase or decrease the mutual information: that is, the difference , called the interaction information, may be positive, negative, or zero. This is the case even when random variables are pairwise independent.

Chain rule for mutual information
The chain rule (as derived above) provides two ways to decompose :

The data processing inequality is closely related to conditional mutual information and can be proven using the chain rule.

Interaction information

The conditional mutual information is used to inductively define the interaction information, a generalization of mutual information, as follows:

where

Because the conditional mutual information can be greater than or less than its unconditional counterpart, the interaction information can be positive, negative, or zero, which makes it hard to interpret.

References

Information theory
Entropy and information